Midway is a former Amtrak intercity train station in the Midway neighborhood of Saint Paul, Minnesota, United States. It was last served by Amtrak's daily Empire Builder (with service from Chicago, Illinois to Seattle, Washington or Portland, Oregon) and, for a time, by the North Star (with service from Chicago, and later from this station, to Duluth, Minnesota), as well as briefly by the North Coast Hiawatha (with service from Chicago to Seattle).

It was one of the first new stations, designated as a "Type 300A" design, built under the Amtrak Standard Stations Program in 1978. The only other station constructed to "Type 300A" design, Miami station, opened three months later and remains in operation today.

The Midway station was closed for passenger service on May 7, 2014, with passenger service being moved to the restored Saint Paul Union Depot. For a time after its closure the station was still used to service the Empire Builder but was later abandoned. As part of the TCMC project, the facility could potentially be reactivated as a crew base and for equipment servicing.

Description

The Midway station is located at 730 Transfer Road and is named after the Midway area of Saint Paul. Its Amtrak station code was MSP and from 1978 to 2014 it served as the only intercity train station for the Minneapolis-Saint Paul metropolitan area. The station can be easily accessed from I‑94/US‑12/US‑52.

Prior to closing for passenger service, the station offered an indoor waiting area, ticketing service and a Quik-Trak kiosk, restrooms, payphones, baggage assistance, and checked baggage. Free long and short parking was also available. Station hours were from 6:00 am to 11:45 pm daily.

The station is located next to tracks owned by the Minnesota Commercial Railway and marks a division point between running on the Canadian Pacific Railway (former Milwaukee Road tracks between Chicago and St. Paul) and the BNSF Railway (former Great Northern Railway tracks between Minneapolis and Seattle.) There are two platforms at the station, though the Empire Builder only used the side platform nearest the station building. There is a second island platform that serves two tracks, but it was rarely used. There are also two spurs behind the main platform which are used for storage and display of historic train cars.

Of the six Minnesota stations served by Amtrak, Midway was the busiest for the Fiscal Year 2013 (its last full year of service), boarding or detraining an average of approximately 321 passengers daily (more than twice the ridership all other Minnesota stations combined).

History

When it opened on March 1, 1978, Midway station replaced Minneapolis Great Northern Depot as the sole intercity station in the Twin Cities. Amtrak had opted to consolidate all of its Twin Cities services in Minneapolis when it began operation in 1971, shuttering the Saint Paul Union Depot. The Great Northern Depot was later demolished.

The primary rail service at this station for most of its existence was the Empire Builder, named to honor Saint Paul-based mogul James J. Hill who constructed the Great Northern Railway, and whose nickname was "The Empire Builder". Westbound trains head for Spokane, Washington (and then split before continuing on to either Seattle, Washington or Portland, Oregon) while eastbound trains head for Chicago. There were several intermittent stops between. The next westbound stop for the Empire Builder was in St. Cloud and the next eastbound stop was in Red Wing, both in Minnesota. About one-eighth of Empire Builder passengers boarded or arrived at this station.

After opening in 1978, the station briefly served the North Coast Hiawatha until that service ended in 1979. The North Coast Hiawatha ran three times per week from Chicago to Seattle with the next westbound stop having also been in St. Cloud and the next eastbound stop having also been in Red Wing. The station was also served by the North Star with services to Chicago and Duluth, with the stop having been in Cambridge, Minnesota and the next southbound stop having been in Red Wing until serviced was truncated from Chicago to this station in 1981. After the North Star was discontinued in 1985, Amtrak has continued service to Duluth with its Thruway Motorcoach service.

On May 7, 2014, Amtrak moved its Twin Cities-area stop to the renovated and reopened Saint Paul Union Depot. After a short time of Midway station being closed to the public, but still serving as a service stop for the Empire Builder, the building was abandoned, ending up on St. Paul's vacant property listings.

As part of the TCMC project, the station is noted as being a potential improvement if deemed necessary by Amtrak. Under the proposal the station would be converted to a layover facility, serving as a crew base, light servicing, cleaning, and kitchen. The $53 million project is currently in final design work, with construction to begin in 2023 and operational in 2024.

See also
 Amtrak
 Chicago, Milwaukee, St. Paul and Pacific Depot Freight House and Train Shed
 Empire Builder
 Minneapolis Great Northern Depot
 North Coast Hiawatha
 North Star (Amtrak train)
 Saint Paul Union Depot

Notes

References

External links

 Amtrak – Stations – St. Paul, MN – Minneapolis, archived page on web.archive.org (10 Feb 2014)
 St. Paul-Minneapolis, MN (MSP)--Great American Stations (Amtrak), archived page on web.archive.org (2 Nov 2012)
 St. Paul-Minneapolis Amtrak Station (USA Rail Guide – Train Web)
 Minneapolis-St. Paul's Midway Station on subwaynut.com
 March 2004 Photo by Greg Smith (Amtrak Photo Archives)

Railway stations in Saint Paul, Minnesota
Former Amtrak stations in Minnesota
Railway stations in the United States opened in 1978
Railway stations closed in 2014